Luke Waechter (born January 5, 1994) is an American soccer player.

Career

College and amateur
Waechter played college soccer at the University of North Carolina at Charlotte from 2012 to 2016, including spending the 2012 season redshirted.

While at college, Waechter also appeared for USL PDL club Carolina Dynamo in 2016.

Professional
Waechter signed with United Soccer League side Charlotte Independence on March 7, 2017.

References

1994 births
Living people
American soccer players
Charlotte 49ers men's soccer players
North Carolina Fusion U23 players
Charlotte Independence players
Soccer players from Georgia (U.S. state)
USL League Two players
USL Championship players
Association football defenders
People from Evans, Georgia
Sportspeople from Augusta, Georgia